The black-necked red cotinga (Phoenicircus nigricollis) is a species of bird in the family Cotingidae, the cotingas.

It is found in the western Amazon Basin of Brazil, Colombia, Ecuador and Peru; also the very southern border region of Venezuela with Amazonas state.
Its natural habitat is subtropical or tropical moist lowland forests.

This is a distinctive red bird with black wings and a narrow black band across the tip of its tail.

Distribution

Western Amazon Basin
The black-necked red cotinga is found in the western Amazon Basin in two distinct ranges, one in the northwest Basin, the other in the central–southwest.

The northwestern range in the Amazon Basin has the Amazon River as its southern limit; in the east it is limited to the Rio Negro confluence with the Amazon and then on its western shore and beyond, upstream and crossing into the very southern border area of Venezuela, but continuing west into all of Amazonian southern Colombia and eastern Ecuador. From this contiguous range it extends southward into the very west of the southwestern Amazon Basin in northern Peru, and is again limited to the northern bank of the lower stretch of the Ucayali River, and the north bank Marañón River-(the western Amazon River).

The second range in the center–southwest is also of similar size and is limited on the west by the east bank of the Madeira River, the north by the Amazon River, and extends the range east beyond the Tapajós River, the lower downstream half.

Of note, the other cotinga in the two-genus Phoenicircus, the Guianan red cotinga has a range in the Guianas and the eastern Amazon Basin; it only intersects ranges with the black-necked in the lower quarter of the Tapajós River drainage, and environs.

References

External links
Graphic; Article w/ species synopsis montereybay.com—"Best Birds of the World"

black-necked red cotinga
Birds of the Amazon Basin
Birds of the Colombian Amazon
Birds of the Ecuadorian Amazon
Birds of the Peruvian Amazon
black-necked red cotinga
Taxonomy articles created by Polbot